In Sikhism, Sarav viāpak (literally "all-prevading god") is the omnipresence of God; since Sikhs hold God to be without form, shape, colour, etc., they see God as present in every living being in the Universe.

Sikhism holds that creation is neither ex nihilo nor from materials lying outside God; it is the result of divine self-revelation by God.  God has revealed or manifested himself in the form of the world.  But God's being is not exhausted in this world alone, it goes beyond this world.

In Sikhism, creation is fully real.  Because God is real, and the world is the expression of God, it follows that the world is also fully real.

References 

Sikh beliefs
Sikh terminology
Conceptions of God
Panentheism